Khatib Kola may refer to:
 Khatib Kola, Lavij
 Khatib Kola, Mianrud